Krass may refer to:

 Krass (surname)
 KRASS, a German non-profit organization
 Krass Clement (born 1946), Danish photographer who has specialized in documentary work
 Krass Engine, video game engine